Thaumasius is a genus in the family of Hummingbirds, and consists of 2 species.

Taxonomy and species list
These two species were formerly placed in the genus Leucippus. A molecular phylogenetic study published in 2014 found that Leucippus was polyphyletic. To resolve the polyphyly these two species were moved to the resurrected genus Thaumasius that had been introduced by Philip Sclater in 1879 with the spot-throated hummingbird as the type species.

Tumbes hummingbird, Thaumasius baeri
Spot-throated hummingbird, Thaumasius taczanowskii

References

Thaumasius
Bird genera
Taxa named by Philip Sclater